Hugo Community Baptist Church is a church and historic church building located in the rural community of Hugo, near Grants Pass, Oregon, United States.

The church was listed on the National Register of Historic Places in 1990.

See also
National Register of Historic Places listings in Josephine County, Oregon

References

External links

Baptist churches in Oregon
Churches on the National Register of Historic Places in Oregon
Churches completed in 1913
Buildings and structures in Josephine County, Oregon
Grants Pass, Oregon
National Register of Historic Places in Josephine County, Oregon
1913 establishments in Oregon